The Last Bohemian is a 1912 Hungarian film directed by Michael Curtiz. It was Curtiz's debut film as a director.

Cast
 Antal Nyáray as Vér Tóni színész
 Elemér Thury as Gál Sándor ügyvéd
 Béla Bodonyi as Schrõder Gusztáv gazdag magánzó
 Zoltán Sipos as István
 Ilonka Bedõ as Ilonka, Schrõder lánya
 Frigyes Hervay as self
 Ernö Király as Király Ernõ

See also
 Michael Curtiz filmography

References

External links

Films directed by Michael Curtiz
1912 directorial debut films
1912 films
Hungarian black-and-white films
Hungarian silent films
Austro-Hungarian films